In geology, a stock is an igneous intrusion that has a surface exposure of less than , differing from batholiths only in being smaller. A stock has a discordant relationship with the rocks that it intrudes. Many stocks are cupolas of hidden batholiths. Some circular or elliptical stocks may be volcanic plugs, which fill the vents of now extinct volcanoes.
A boss is a small stock.

Examples
 the Alta and Clayton Peak stocks (composed of granodiorite), near Park City, Utah
 the Hellroaring Creek and Salal Creek stocks (of granite-granodiorite and quartz monzonite, respectively) in British Columbia, Canada
 the Céret stock (of gabbro and diorite) in Pyrénées-Orientales, France
 the Parashi stock (of tonalite) in La Guajira Department, Colombia
 stocks of syenite in the Caldera de Tejeda on Gran Canaria 
 Ailsa Craig granitic boss, which forms a volcanic plug, in Scotland

References

 
Igneous intrusions